The National Housing Conference (NHC) is an American non-profit organization based in Washington, D.C. established in 1931.

History 
In 1931, Mary Kingsbury Simkhovitch, a reformer and social worker, formed the National Public Housing Conference, which became the National Housing Conference (NHC), the first non-partisan, independent coalition of national housing leaders from both the public and private sector. Simkhovitch believed that imaginative programs could replace slums with decent housing and revive the creative spirit of a community. In 1934, NHC pushed hard to get the Federal Home Loan Bank Board set up, and helped engineer the passage of the National Housing Act of 1934, which created the Federal Housing Administration (FHA).
 
NHC's efforts in the 1950s and 1960s helped secure the expansion of the Housing Act of 1949 in 1954, which included authorization of slum clearance and permitted rent adjustments based on income.  Part of Lyndon B. Johnson’s “Great Society” included the creation of the U.S. Department of Housing and Urban Development (HUD) in 1965, a cabinet level department with decent housing as its only goal.
 
In 1973, Clara Fox, executive director of the Settlement Housing Fund, organized developers, lenders, builders, property managers, residents and others interested in affordable housing into a powerful coalition to fight President Richard Nixon’s actions to limit federal housing programs.  The following year, this coalition, the New York Housing Conference (NYHC), affiliated with NHC. Fox served as co-chair of NYHC until her death in December 2007.
 
After Presidents Gerald Ford and Jimmy Carter authorized record high budgets for HUD in the 1970s, the election of Ronald Reagan in 1982 led to drastic housing budget cuts. Despite the reluctance of the Reagan Administration, NHC successfully lobbied for Low-Income Housing Tax Credit legislation, which gave private investors a 10-year tax incentive to invest in affordable housing by providing equity for multi-family housing with a designated number of units for low-income tenants.  This remains the most important incentive for financing low-income housing.
 
In 1992, President Bill Clinton’s new HUD administration approached NHC for help in determining how best to preserve the 940,000 Section 8 program units facing defaults. NHC convened a special task force numbering over 110 industry leaders from all different sectors of the housing industry. The coalition drafted a proposal that resulted in “Mark to Market” legislation, helping to preserve hundreds of thousands of rental units. Also in 1992, NHC created the Center for Housing Policy, an affiliated housing research organization dedicated to conducting practical and relevant research for housing practitioners and policymakers.  Jeffrey Lubell serves as executive director of the center.

Leadership 
David Dworkin serves as president and CEO of NHC and Steve O'Connor is the chair of the Board of Governors.

Regional housing forums 
NHC holds several regional housing forums each year, in partnership with a network of other national, state and local housing and related organizations. The forums discuss national issues, including affordability, sustainability, and housing's connections to transportation, economic development, education, public health, and more.

Regional affiliates 
The New York Housing Conference (NYHC) was established in 1973 to develop and advocate for affordable housing policy and programs at the federal, state and city level. NYHC has worked with local government agencies to create low-, moderate- and middle-income housing programs locally and has helped gain enactment of major housing legislation.

Founded in 1997, the California Housing Consortium/CHC Institute is a coalition of developers, lenders, state and local government officials, homebuilders, investors, property managers, residents and housing professionals.

References

External links
National Housing Conference

Affordable housing
Non-profit organizations based in Washington, D.C.